The 1928 Duquesne Dukes football team was an American football team that represented Duquesne University as an independent during the 1928 college football season. In its second season under head coach Elmer Layden, Duquesne compiled an 8–1 record and outscored opponents by a total of 118 to 32.

Schedule

References

Duquesne
Duquesne Dukes football seasons
Duquesne Dukes football